Soul Sign is a heavy metal group based out of Los Angeles featuring Bjorn Englen on bass, Mark Boals on vocals, Mike Cancino on drums, and Rob Math on guitar.

The band has toured in US 1997-2001, 2010-2014, 2019 and in Europe 2010 & 2013. Their discography includes "Control", "Released by Xmas" and the latest album "Life In The Dark".

After a successful show at The Sunset Strip Music Festival in Los Angeles in August 2012 with Mark Boals on vocals, the band decided to recruit Boals as their new singer. Former vocalist Michael Olivieri had decided to strictly focus on a solo career.

In May 2013 Soul Sign toured Scandinavia with shows in Denmark and Sweden in support of "Life In the Dark".

The band plans on releasing their forthcoming album in 2023 with tour dates to follow.

Band members
Current members
Mark Boals - vocals (since 2012)
Bjorn Englen - bass guitar (since 1995)
Rob Math - guitar (2010-2012, 2021-current)
Mike Cancino - drums (since 2011)

Former members
Magnus Andersson (guitar) 1995-1996
David Keckhut (vocals) 1996 & 2000-2001
Glen Sobel (drums) 1996
David Jordan (drums) 1997-2001
Michael Helge (guitar) 1997-1998 & 2011
David Hare (vocals) 1997-1998
Sebastian Nicolescu (vocals) 1998
Scott Ramsay (guitar) 1998 & 2007-2010
Mike Taylor (drums) 2006-2011
Michael Olivieri (vocals) 2007-2012
Adam Jones (drums) 2010 & 2013
Dave Bates (guitar) 2012 & 2019
Jan Mengeling (guitar) 2012-2018

References

External links
 Facebook

Musical groups from Los Angeles
Heavy metal musical groups from California